Francisco Javier 'Javi' Cabezas Chounavelle (born 28 February 1990) is a Spanish professional footballer who plays for CF La Nucía as a winger.

Club career
Born in Córdoba, Andalusia, Cabezas made his senior debut in 2009 with local amateurs UD La Voz. In the following three seasons he played in Tercera División, representing Peñarroya CF, CD Pozoblanco and Córdoba CF B.

Cabezas appeared in his first competitive game with Córdoba's first team on 17 October 2012, coming on as a 62nd-minute substitute in a 1–0 away win over CE Sabadell FC in the third round of the Copa del Rey. His first match in Segunda División occurred on 17 February of the following year, when he featured the last 12 minutes of the 1–1 home draw against AD Alcorcón. He finished the campaign with one more league appearance (against Villarreal CF on 3 March).

In July 2013, Cabezas was loaned to Segunda División B club Écija Balompié. After subsequent loans at SD Huesca and Barakaldo CF in the same league, he was released.

Cabezas continued to compete in the third tier the following years, representing La Hoya Lorca CF, CD Tudelano, CD Ebro and CF La Nucía.

References

External links

1990 births
Living people
Spanish footballers
Footballers from Córdoba, Spain
Association football wingers
Segunda División players
Segunda División B players
Tercera División players
Primera Federación players
Segunda Federación players
CD Pozoblanco players
Córdoba CF B players
Córdoba CF players
Écija Balompié players
SD Huesca footballers
Barakaldo CF footballers
Lorca FC players
CD Tudelano footballers
CD Ebro players
CF La Nucía players